is a Japanese politician serving as the Chairman of the Policy Research Council of the Liberal Democratic Party. He previously served as Minister of Economy, Trade and Industry from October 2021 to August 2022, and was Deputy Chief Cabinet Secretary from 2015 to 2016 and Minister of Education, Culture, Sports, Science and Technology from 2019 to 2021.

Overview 

Born and raised in Hachiōji, Hagiuda graduated from Waseda Jitsugyo High School, and Meiji University with a Bachelor of Commerce degree in 1987.

While still a university student, Hagiuda began working as an aide to Ryuichi Kurosu, a former member of the Tokyo Metropolitan Assembly and Mayor of Hachiōji. In 1991, at the age of 27, Hagiuda won a seat in the Hachiōji City Assembly, becoming the youngest candidate ever to do so. He then ran successfully for a seat in the Tokyo Metropolitan Assembly in 2002, serving part of one term. In 2004, he ran for a seat in the House of Representatives of Japan, and won. Hagiuda then won re-election in the 2005 general election by a large margin. He lost his seat in the 2009 general election, but won again in the 2012 general election and the 2014 general election.

Affiliated to the nationalist lobby Nippon Kaigi, Hagiuda is known as a conservative within the LDP, and is closely allied with former Prime Ministers Shinzō Abe and Yoshiro Mori. In October 2015, he became the Deputy Chief Cabinet Secretary, serving in that position for a year. He belongs to the Abe faction (Seiwa Seisaku Kenkyukai) of the LDP.

On 10 August 2022, Hagiuda was dismissed from the Second Kishida Cabinet because of ties to the Unification Church. His dismissal was part of a wider purge by the Kishida administration following the assassination of Shinzo Abe and increasing media scrutiny of LDP officials' close ties with the church.  Hagiuda had previously denied any relation to the media but his statements were refuted by a Unification Church official who stated he was "like one of the family." The official stated that Hagiuda made regular visits to the Church's Hachioji office, making speeches there 1 to 2 times a month and regularly attending sunday barbecues and christmas parties.

Personal life 

Hagiuda is married, and has one daughter and one son. His hobbies include sports such as baseball, rugby, and golf. He also enjoys watching movies, holding movie-viewing events annually in conjunction with his personal support group, or koenkai. His personal website also lists "trying new restaurants" as a hobby, calling him a "self-proclaimed gourmet", and also mentions his frequent enjoyment of after-meal ramen.

References

External links 
  Official website

|-

1963 births
Living people
People from Hachiōji, Tokyo
Members of the House of Representatives from Tokyo
Members of the Tokyo Metropolitan Assembly
Japanese municipal councilors
Members of Nippon Kaigi
Liberal Democratic Party (Japan) politicians
Meiji University alumni
21st-century Japanese politicians
Education ministers of Japan
Minister of Economy, Trade and Industry of Japan